Moskovske may refer to several places in Ukraine:

Moskovske (urban-type settlement), Donetsk Oblast
Moskovske (village), Donetsk Oblast
Moskovske, Romny Raion, Sumy Oblast
Moskovske, Shostka Raion, Sumy Oblast